Pierre-Alain Raphan (born 6 April 1983 in Choisy-le-Roi) is a French accountant and politician representing La République En Marche! He was elected to the French National Assembly on 18 June 2017, representing the 10th constituency of the department of Essonne.

In parliament, Raphan serves on the Committee on Cultural Affairs and Education. He is also a member of the French Parliamentary Friendship Group with Azerbaijan. In 2020, Raphan joined En commun (EC), a group within LREM led by Barbara Pompili.

See also
 2017 French legislative election

References

1983 births
Living people
People from Choisy-le-Roi
La République En Marche! politicians
Deputies of the 15th National Assembly of the French Fifth Republic
Members of Parliament for Essonne